Presidente João Suassuna Airport  is the airport serving Campina Grande, Brazil. It is named after João Suassuna (1886-1930), President of the State of Paraíba (at the time in Brazil, State Governors had the title of President) from 1924 to 1928.

It is operated by AENA.

History
Even though the airport was only inaugurated in 1963, since the 1940s air services operated to the site, using an existent runway.

Infraero became the operator of the airport in 1980. In 1984 and 1998 it made existensive renovation works, which included a new terminal capable of handling 250,000 passengers/year, and the renovation of the apron and runway. In 2003 it was re-inaugurated.

Previously operated by Infraero, on March 15, 2019 AENA won a 30-year concession to operate the airport.

Airlines and destinations

Accidents and incidents
5 September 1958: a Lóide Aéreo Nacional Curtiss C-46D-15-CU Commando registration PP-LDX operating flight 652 from Recife crashed during approach to Campina Grande. Of a total of 18 people aboard, 2 crew members and 11 passengers died.

Access

See also

List of airports in Brazil

References

External links

Airports in Paraíba
Airports established in 1963
Campina Grande